Speakes is an English surname. It may refer to:

People
 Larry Speakes (1939–2014), an acting press spokesman for the White House under President Reagan
 Stephen M. Speakes (b. 1952), a United States Army lieutenant general

Fictional characters
 The Speakeses, a family in the soap opera Guiding Light, including Hampton (Vince Williams), Kathryn (Nia Long) and Gilly Speakes (Amelia Marshall).

English-language surnames
Surnames of English origin